The Mill Springs Battlefield National Monument was the location of the Battle of Mill Springs (also known as Battle of Fishing Creek and as Battle of Logan's Crossroads) in January 1862. It was declared to be a U.S. National Historic Landmark in 1993 and authorized as a national monument in 2019. After acquisition of property by the National Park Service it was established as a unit on September 22, 2020.

Several separated areas related to the battle have been listed on the National Register of Historic Places: the Confederate Mass Grave Monument in Somerset, Gen. Felix K. Zollicoffer Monument, West-Metcalfe House, and the Mill Springs National Cemetery.

Area
The initial designated area for the National Register of Historic Places included three separate areas: the battlefield, and two separate areas with Confederate fortifications on each side of Lake Cumberland (one near Mill Springs, and the other by Beech Grove).

The main difference in the land from 1862 to the modern day is that the landscape is less wooded. Also the name of the town during the battle was Logan's Crossing, when today it is called Nancy. There are no buildings left that were standing during the war, although none of the modern buildings seriously detracted from the area's National Register status. Two of the 29 noncontributing structures on the battlefield during the nomination were later placed on the National Register; both were monuments placed on the battlefield in 1910.

Visitor Center and Museum

The Mill Springs Battlefield Visitors Center and Museum commemorates the January 1862 Battle of Mill Springs, fought during the early days of the American Civil War. The museum is located in Nancy, Kentucky, just past the northern edge of the battlefield, overlooking where Union forces camped. It is adjacent to the Mill Springs National Cemetery, which contains the Federal interments (the Confederate burials are at Zollicoffer Park, a short distance away, on the battlefield proper). The museum was formally dedicated on November 4, 2006.

Operated by the Mill Springs Battlefield Association, the museum consists of a central foyer where greeters welcome guests and direct them to the various parts of the museum, which consists of a community room, library, legacy room, and exhibition hall, as well as a gift shop. There is also a high-security space for traveling exhibits.  The Brown-Lanier House, used as a headquarters during the battle, is also owned by the Battlefield Association. It is maintained as a bed and breakfast.

On January 15, 2013, Kentucky Representative Hal Rogers introduced the bill H.R. 298, officially titled "To direct the  Secretary of the Interior to conduct a special resource study to evaluate the significance of the Mill Springs Battlefield located in Pulaski and Wayne Counties, Kentucky, and the feasibility of its inclusion in the National Park System, and for other purposes," into the United States Congress. Rogers said that "the Battle of Mill Springs is a source of great pride and interest to the people I serve." Rogers argued that the battlefield was a "jewel" and would be "an excellent addition to the National Park Service." The bill passed the House by voice vote but did not pass the Senate.

The Department of the Interior, in a statement given at a subcommittee hearing, said that it "supports" the enactment, but believes that "priority should be given to the 28 previously authorized studies for potential units of the National Park System, potential new National Heritage Areas, and potential additions to the National Trails System and National Wild and Scenic Rivers System that have not yet been transmitted to the Congress."

The John D. Dingell Jr. Conservation, Management, and Recreation Act, signed into law March 12, 2019, authorized it as a national monument, established upon acquisition of property by the National Park Service.

Zollicoffer Park
Zollicoffer Park features two separate monuments that are on the National Register of Historic Places.  These are the General Felix K. Zollicoffer Monument just inside the park, and the Confederate Mass Grave Monument in Somerset which is further into the park.  Both were built due to a local girl by the name of Dorotha Burton decorating a white oak tree in Confederate general Felix K. Zollicoffer's honor, who had died in the battle after failing to realize he was close to the Union lines; he thought he was close to his Confederate lines.  In 1995 the tree was destroyed during a lightning storm, but a sapling from that tree was put in its place in 1997, and is also called the Zollie tree.

See also
 List of national monuments of the United States
West-Metcalfe House, headquarters of Zollicoffer before the battle, also listed on the National Register

Notes

References
"It's Open!", The Zollie Tree, V. XI, No. 7, Winter 2007 (newsletter of the Mill Springs Battlefield Association)
 Somerset, Kentucky Commonwealth-Journal, "Here's Hoping Battlefield Will Survive Turmoil", January 19, 2007

External links

Official National Park Service site
Mill Springs Battlefield Association
The Battle of Mill Springs: The Civil War Divides a Border State, a National Park Service Teaching with Historic Places (TwHP) lesson plan

American Civil War museums in Kentucky
Historic districts on the National Register of Historic Places in Kentucky
National Historic Landmarks in Kentucky
Museums in Pulaski County, Kentucky
Protected areas of Wayne County, Kentucky
Protected areas of Pulaski County, Kentucky
National Register of Historic Places in Pulaski County, Kentucky
National Register of Historic Places in Wayne County, Kentucky
Protected areas established in 2019
2019 establishments in Kentucky
Battlefield National Monument
American Civil War on the National Register of Historic Places
Conflict sites on the National Register of Historic Places in Kentucky